Amit Rai is an Indian film director and writer. He won the Gollapudi Srinivas Award in 2010 for directing Road to Sangam. His 2009 Marathi film Tingya, won him the best director award at the International Film Festival of South Africa, 2009.

References

External links

Living people
Year of birth missing (living people)
Indian film directors
Indian screenwriters